Qasim Rashid (born July 21, 1982) is a Pakistani-born American author, activist, and attorney. A member of the Democratic Party, Rashid was an unsuccessful candidate for the Virginia State Senate in 2019 and the Democratic nominee for Virginia's 1st congressional district in the 2020 election.

Early life and education 
Rashid was born in Rawalpindi, Pakistan, in 1982. His father was an Ahmadiyya missionary. In 1987, he moved with his family to the United States, where they lived in Washington, D.C. and Chicago, Illinois. He is a graduate of the University of Illinois at Urbana–Champaign and received his Juris Doctor degree from the University of Richmond School of Law. He served as executive editor of The Richmond Journal of Global Law and Business.

Career 
From 2006 to 2009, Rashid served as the Associate Director of Admissions for Kaplan University. In October 2010, Rashid rallied a group of Muslim youth to march on Washington, raising slogans of "Love for all, hatred for none" as a part of the "Muslims for Peace" campaign. In August of that year, The New York Times ran a feature story on Rashid, covering his outreach efforts in the American Midwest.

Rashid has written for numerous outlets including Time, NPR and The Independent. His essay "I believe in love for all, hatred for none" was featured on NPR's This I Believe. As a freelance author, he has written on Donald Trump's so-called "Muslim ban" and other current affairs, such as the 2019 Christchurch shooting and the subsequent debate on gun control.

Political career 
In 2019, Rashid announced his candidacy for the 28th district of the Virginia Senate. He defeated Laura Ann Sellers in the Democratic primary, before losing to incumbent Republican Richard Stuart in the general election.

On January 20, 2020, Rashid announced his candidacy for Virginia's 1st congressional district in the 2020 election. On June 23, 2020, Rashid defeated Vangie Williams in the Democratic primary. He lost to incumbent Republican Rob Wittman in the general election.

Works 
Rashid has authored three books, The Wrong Kind of Muslim; Extremist: A Response to Geert Wilders & Terrorists Everywhere; and Talk To Me: Changing the Narrative on Race, Religion, and Education, and has co-authored and co-edited two books, Towards a Greater Jihad and By the Dawn's Early Light.

The Wrong Kind of Muslim 
Released in June 2013, The Wrong Kind of Muslim was Rashid's first book. It received financial support through crowd-sourcing. It looks at the treatment of Ahmadi Muslims and other minority faiths in Pakistan. Rashid conveys the stories of those who were jailed, injured, and martyred for their faith. He also seeks to explain why they maintain their faith.

Talk To Me 
Talk to Me was published on May 17, 2016. It is a nonfiction memoir from inspiring thought leaders on how the power of dialogue can overcome racism, xenophobia, intolerance, and violence. It highlights the importance of meaningful and moral conversation between people of all faiths, ages, genders, etc., to facilitate understanding and tolerance and promote a more peaceful society.

Hannah and the Ramadan Gift 
Rashid will release his first children's book through Penguin Publishing, Hannah and the Ramadan Gift.

Electoral history

Personal life 
Rashid is an Ahmadi Muslim, is married with three children, and lives in Stafford, Virginia. He is the younger brother of Tayyib Rashid, a United States Marine who runs a social media outreach brand as "the Muslim Marine". Tayyib Rashid has also given media interviews and raises awareness about Muslims living in the United States. Rashid grew up with actor Lamorne Morris.

Rashid has defended his Ahmadiyya faith against criticism.

References

External links 
Rashid for Congress campaign website

1982 births
American Ahmadis
American Muslims
Human rights lawyers
Living people
Muslim apologists
Virginia Democrats
Pakistani Ahmadis
Pakistani emigrants to the United States
Candidates in the 2019 United States elections
Candidates in the 2020 United States elections